Guidon Games produced board games and rulebooks for wargaming with miniatures, and in doing so influenced Tactical Studies Rules (later TSR, Inc.), the publisher of Dungeons & Dragons.  The Guidon Games publishing imprint was the property of Lowrys Hobbies (later Lowry Enterprises), a mail-order business owned by Don and Julie Lowry.  About a dozen titles were released under the imprint from 1971 to 1973.

History
By the late 1960s the miniature wargaming hobby had grown large enough that there was a demand for rulebooks dedicated to a single historical period.  Don Featherstone of the UK produced booklets for eight different periods in 1966.  A few years later the Wargames Research Group began producing rulesets with an emphasis on historical accuracy.

With this trend in mind Lowry conceived the Wargaming with Miniatures series for which he recruited rulebook authors from the ranks of the International Federation of Wargamers.  Through the IFW Lowry met Gary Gygax, who served as series editor.  Gygax began working for Guidon in 1970. Gygax and Jeff Perren's set of rules for medieval miniatures that had been published in the Castle & Crusade Society's The Domesday Book resulted in Gygax being hired by Guidon Games to develop their "Wargaming with Miniatures" series of games. Gygax also co-authored the first title in the series, Chainmail, which became Guidon's best seller. The series came to include games and books by Lou Zocchi, Tom Wham, and Dave Arneson. Other notable titles in the series are Tractics, one of the first published games to make use of the 20-sided die, and Don't Give Up The Ship!, the first collaboration between Gygax and Arneson, the co-creators of Dungeons & Dragons.

Guidon also produced Avalon Hill style board wargames, as well as supplements designed to be used with existing Avalon Hill board games.  Avalon Hill later republished Alexander the Great, one of Guidon's stand-alone games, while TSR republished Fight in the Skies.

Guidon was a small publisher, and print runs were never more than a few thousand.  Lowry apparently failed to recognize the potential of Dungeons & Dragons, prompting Gygax to found TSR.  Gygax made the following recollection about the company in 2004:

Guidon Games had a game shop, sold gaming via the mail, published a magazine and likewise printed and sold military miniatures rulebooks and boxed board wargames. They were small but certainly a legitimate company....  I was paid for the work I did for them, yes. Unfortunately, sales volume did not make the income received thus sufficient to do more than supplement income from other work. I was asked to go to work for them full time. That would have required me to move to the state of Maine. Tom Wham did so, but I thought their new location was a poor choice. Furthermore, the company was not run in an aggressive and responsive manner. In my opinion there was no chance for growth and success as things stood and I said so to Guidon. Sadly, I was correct in my judgement.

Despite its brief existence, Guidon had a large influence on TSR and the nascent RPG industry. In addition to Gygax and Arneson, Lowry worked with Lou Zocchi, Tom Wham, and Mike Carr.  TSR initially patterned itself on Guidon, publishing sets of wargaming rules such as Cavaliers and Roundheads in the same pamphlet format used by Guidon.  TSR took over some of Guidon's titles in 1975.

In 1972 Lowry acquired Panzerfaust Magazine. In 1973 the Guidon Games imprint was shut down by its parent company, Lowry Hobbies. Lowry published Panzerfaust Magazine instead under the name "Panzerfaust Publications".

Products

Wargaming with Miniatures Series

Board Games

Board Game Supplements

Footnotes

External links
 Acaeum Website Chainmail Page
 

Board game publishing companies
Wargame companies